Utetheisa lactea is a moth of the family Erebidae. It was described by Arthur Gardiner Butler in 1884 and is found in the Seychelles.

Subspecies
 Utetheisa lactea lactea  (Butler, 1884)
 Utetheisa lactea aldabrensis  T. B. Fletcher, 1910

This species has a wingspan of 37 mm.

Biology
This species feeds on Tournefortia argentea (Boraginaceae).

References

lactea
Fauna of Seychelles
Moths described in 1884